Evan McCollough (born September 2, 1987) is a former professional Canadian football defensive back who played in the Canadian Football League (CFL).

College football
McCollough played college football for the James Madison Dukes.

Professional football

Toronto Argonauts
On May 28, 2010, McCollough signed as a free agent with the Toronto Argonauts. McCollough was a member of the 100th Grey Cup winning team.

Hamilton Tiger-Cats
On February 15, 2013, McCollough signed with the Hamilton Tiger-Cats. He was released by the Tiger-Cats on June 21, 2014.

Toronto Argonauts
McCollough was signed to the Toronto Argonauts' practice roster on August 30, 2014.

References

External links
CFL profile page
Toronto Argonauts bio

1987 births
Living people
American football defensive backs
Canadian football defensive backs
African-American players of American football
African-American players of Canadian football
Tampa Bay Buccaneers players
Toronto Argonauts players
Players of American football from Maryland
People from Prince George's County, Maryland
Hamilton Tiger-Cats players
James Madison Dukes football players
21st-century African-American sportspeople
20th-century African-American people